Tennis at the 2005 Southeast Asian Games took place on several separate courts at the Rizal Memorial Sports Complex in Manila, Philippines. The participants competed for four gold medals.

Medal table

Medalists

External links
Southeast Asian Games Official Results

2005 Southeast Asian Games events
Southeast Asian Games
2005
2005 Southeast Asian Games